BIBP-3226 is a drug used in scientific research which acts as a potent and selective antagonist for both the Neuropeptide Y receptor Y1 and also the neuropeptide FF receptor. It was the first non-peptide antagonist developed for the Y1 receptor and has been widely used to help determine its functions in the body. Activation of Y1 is thought to be involved in functions such as regulation of appetite and anxiety, and BIBP-3226 has anxiogenic and anorectic effects, as well as blocking the Y1-mediated corticotropin releasing hormone release. It has also been used as a lead compound to develop a number of newer more potent Y1 antagonists.

References 

Neuropeptide Y antagonists